The 2015 Cheltenham Gold Cup (known as the Betfred Gold Cup for sponsorship reasons) was the 87th annual running of the Cheltenham Gold Cup horse race and was held at Cheltenham Racecourse on Friday 13 March 2015.

The race was won by Coneygree with a winning margin of a length and a half at the line. Coneygree became the first novice to win the Cheltenham Gold Cup since 1974.

Build-up
A week before the race Silviniaco Conti was listed as the favourite at odds of 3/1.	
 
The race was shown live on Channel 4 in the UK and Ireland.

Details
 Sponsor: Betfred
 Winner's prize money: £313,225.00 
 Going:Soft, Good to Soft in places
 Number of runners: 16
 Winner's time: 6m 42.70s

Full result

* The distances between the horses are shown in lengths or shorter. shd = short-head.† Trainers are based in Great Britain unless indicated. PU = pulled-up. NR = non runner

See also
Horse racing in Great Britain
List of British National Hunt races
2015 Grand National

References

External links
Cheltenham Gold Cup at the Racing Post

Cheltenham Gold Cup
 2015
Cheltenham Gold Cup
Cheltenham Gold Cup
2010s in Gloucestershire